The Lethrinidae are a family of fishes in the order Perciformes commonly known as emperors, emperor breams, and pigface breams.

These fish are found in tropical waters of the Pacific and Indian Oceans, and Lethrinus atlanticus is also found in the eastern Atlantic Ocean. They are benthic feeders, consuming invertebrates and small fishes. Some species have molariform teeth which they use to eat shelled invertebrates, such as mollusks and crabs.

Gallery

References 

Carpenter, K. E. and G. R. Allen (Hrsg.): Emperor fishes and large-eye breams of the world (Family Lethrinidae). An annotated and illustrated catalogue of lethrinid species known to date. FAO Species Catalogue Vol. 9, Rom 1989. (Download)

External links 
 Ichthyological Bulletin; No. 17: Fishes of the family Lethrinidae from the Western Indian Ocean

 
Fish of Hawaii
Taxa named by Charles Lucien Bonaparte